The 1996 Ball State Cardinals football team was an American football team that represented Ball State University in the Mid-American Conference (MAC) during the 1996 NCAA Division I-A football season. In its second season under head coach Bill Lynch, the team compiled an 8–4 record (7–1 against conference opponents), won the MAC championship, and lost to Nevada in the 1996 Las Vegas Bowl. The team played its home games at Ball State Stadium in Muncie, Indiana.

The team's statistical leaders included Brent Baldwin with 1,703 passing yards, Michael Blair with 680 rushing yards, Ed Abernathy with 425 receiving yards, and Brent Lockliear with 56 points scored.

Schedule

References

Ball State
Ball State Cardinals football seasons
Mid-American Conference football champion seasons
Ball State Cardinals football